These are the official results of the Women's 100 metres event at the 1995 IAAF World Championships in Gothenburg, Sweden. There were a total number of 58 participating athletes, with two semi-finals, four quarter-finals and eight qualifying heats and the final held on Monday 7 August 1995. The winner, Gwen Torrence of the United States, made history as the first mother to win 100 metre gold at the World Championships.

Final

Semi-finals
Held on Monday 1995-08-07

Quarterfinals
Held on Sunday 1995-08-06

Qualifying heats
Held on Sunday 1995-08-06

References

https://web.archive.org/web/20041212070800/http://www2.iaaf.org/results/past/WCH95/index.html Results]

H
100 metres at the World Athletics Championships
1995 in women's athletics